Chanchai Sor Tamarangsri (born October 19, 1967 in Pak Chong) is a Thai Muay Thai fighter. He is former 3 times Lumpinee Stadium and Muay Thai World champion, he was a popular fighter during the golden era of Muay Thai.

Biography and career
Chanchai started training at the age of 11 in his hometown of Pak Chong at the Sor.Kiatdisak camp, he was inspired by his father who was himself a fighter. At 17 he joined the Tamarangsri gym in the Nakhon Ratchasima Province and made his debut in Bangkok the same year.

Chanchai was a highly regarded technician with one of the best teep kick in Muay Thai history. He was nicknamed Poot 2 in reference to the Muay Thai legend of the 70s Poot Lorlek. He fought for the biggest promoter of the time Songchai Rattanasuban and had purses going as high as 180,000 THB.

Since his retirement Chanchai teaches physical education in schools and Muay Thai in various camps. He is regularly consulted by the Sports Authority of Thailand to help at the preservation of Muay Thai knowledge, in 2016 he received the award for Muay Thai ambassador of the year.

Titles & honours
Lumpinee Stadium
 1985 Lumpinee Stadium (118 lbs) champion (2 defenses)
 1986 Lumpinee Stadium (118 lbs) champion (1 defense)
 1987 Lumpinee Stadium (126 lbs) champion (2 defenses)

World Muay Thai Association
 1989 Muay Thai World (130 lbs) champion

Channel 7 Stadium
 1995 Channel 7 Stadium (135 lbs) champion

Omnoi Stadium
 1996 Isuzu Cup Runner-up

Fight record

|-  style="background:#fbb;"
| 1996-|| Loss ||align=left| Tappaya Sit-Or||   || Songkhla, Thailand || Decision || 5 || 3:00

|-  style="background:#fbb;"
| 1996-03-16|| Loss ||align=left| Suwitlek Sor.Kaokarat || Omnoi Stadium - Isuzu Cup Final  || Samut Sakhon, Thailand || Decision || 5 || 3:00
|-
! style=background:white colspan=9 |

|-  style="background:#cfc;"
| 1995-11-11|| Win||align=left| Thepparit Tor.Tawatchai || Omnoi Stadium - Isuzu Cup  || Samut Sakhon, Thailand || Decision || 5 || 3:00
|-  style="background:#cfc;"
| 1995-|| Win||align=left| Chalunlap Sor.Rungroj || Channel 7 Stadium  || Bangkok, Thailand || Decision || 5 || 3:00
|-
! style=background:white colspan=9 |
|-  style="background:#cfc;"
| 1995-05-14|| Win||align=left| Tappaya Sit-Or || Channel 7 Stadium  || Bangkok, Thailand || Decision || 5 || 3:00
|-  style="background:#cfc;"
| 1995-03-19|| Win||align=left| Khunpon Kaewsamrit || Channel 7 Stadium  || Bangkok, Thailand || Decision || 5 || 3:00
|-  style="background:#cfc;"
| 1995-02-05|| Win||align=left| Mantai Sakmethee || Channel 7 Stadium  || Bangkok, Thailand || Decision || 5 || 3:00
|-  style="background:#cfc;"
| ? || Win||align=left| Pepsi Biyapan ||   || Bangkok, Thailand || Decision || 5 || 3:00
|-  style="background:#fbb;"
| 1994-07-18|| Loss ||align=left| Kukrit Sor.Nayaiam || Rajadamnern Stadium  || Bangkok, Thailand || Referee Stoppage|| 5 ||
|-  style="background:#fbb;"
| 1994-02-09|| Loss ||align=left| Kongnapa BM Service || Rajadamnern Stadium  || Bangkok, Thailand || Decision || 5 || 3:00
|-  style="background:#cfc;"
| 1993-11-27|| Win||align=left| Sangtiennoi Sor.Rungroj || Lumpinee Stadium  || Bangkok, Thailand || Decision || 5 || 3:00
|-  style="background:#fbb;"
| 1993-10-22|| Loss||align=left| Sangtiennoi Sor.Rungroj || Lumpinee Stadium  || Bangkok, Thailand || Decision || 5 || 3:00
|-  style="background:#fbb;"
| 1993-06-11 || Loss ||align=left| Sakmongkol Sithchuchok || Lumpinee Stadium || Bangkok, Thailand || Decision  || 5 || 3:00
|-  style="background:#cfc;"
| 1993-02-22|| Win ||align=left| Taweechai Wor.Preecha || Rajadamnern Stadium  || Bangkok, Thailand || Decision || 5 || 3:00
|-  style="background:#fbb;"
| 1992-12-05 || Loss ||align=left| Sakmongkol Sithchuchok|| Lumpinee Stadium || Bangkok, Thailand || Decision || 5 || 3:00
|-  style="background:#cfc;"
| 1992-11-13|| Win ||align=left| Sangtiennoi Sor.Rungroj || Lumpinee Stadium  || Bangkok, Thailand || Decision || 5 || 3:00
|-  style="background:#fbb;"
| 1992-10-23 || Loss ||align=left| Jaroenthong Kiatbanchong ||  || Bangkok, Thailand || Decision || 5 || 3:00
|-  style="background:#cfc;"
| 1992-09-25 || Win ||align=left| Orono Por Muang Ubon ||  || Bangkok, Thailand || Decision  || 5 || 3:00
|-  style="background:#cfc;"
| 1992-08-29 || Win ||align=left| Jirasak Por Pongsawang || Lumpinee Stadium || Bangkok, Thailand || Decision  || 5 || 3:00
|-  style="background:#fbb;"
| 1992-06-30 || Loss ||align=left| Sakmongkol Sithchuchok|| Lumpinee Stadium || Bangkok, Thailand || Decision || 5 || 3:00
|-  style="background:#fbb;"
| 1992-03-17 || Loss ||align=left| Sanit Wichitkriangkrai || Lumpinee Stadium || Bangkok, Thailand || Decision  || 5 || 3:00
|-  style="background:#fbb;"
| 1992-01-07 || Loss ||align=left| Sanit Wichitkriangkrai || Lumpinee Stadium || Bangkok, Thailand || Decision  || 5 || 3:00
|-  style="background:#cfc;"
| 1991-12-10 || Win ||align=left| Dejsak Sakpradu ||Lumpinee Stadium  || Bangkok, Thailand || Decision  || 5 || 3:00
|-  style="background:#cfc;"
| 1991-11-15 || Win ||align=left| Khamsanya Tor.Sitthichai ||  || Bangkok, Thailand || Decision  || 5 || 3:00
|-  style="background:#cfc;"
| 1991-10-15 || Win ||align=left| Klasuk Tor.Wittaya||  || Bangkok, Thailand || Decision  || 5 || 3:00
|-  style="background:#fbb;"
| 1991-09-10 || Loss ||align=left| Klasuk Tor.Wittaya|| Lumpinee Stadium || Bangkok, Thailand || Decision  || 5 || 3:00
|-  bgcolor="#fbb"
| 1991-07-02|| Loss ||align=left| Coban Lookchaomaesaitong ||Lumpinee Stadium || Bangkok, Thailand || KO  || 1 ||
|-  style="background:#cfc;"
| 1991-06-01 || Win ||align=left| Panomrunglek Chor.Sawat ||  || Bangkok, Thailand || Decision  || 5 || 3:00
|-  style="background:#cfc;"
| 1991-04-13 || Win ||align=left| Boonchai Tor.Tuwanon || Lumpinee Stadium || Bangkok, Thailand || Decision  || 5 || 3:00
|-  style="background:#cfc;"
| 1991-02-05 || Win||align=left| Nongmoon Chiomputhong || Lumpinee Stadium || Bangkok, Thailand || Decision  || 5 || 3:00
|-  style="background:#fbb;"
| 1990-09-08 || Loss ||align=left| Boonchai Tor.Tuwanon || Lumpinee Stadium || Bangkok, Thailand || Decision  || 5 || 3:00
|-  style="background:#;"
| 1990-07-13 || ||align=left| Roj Lukrangsee || Lumpinee Stadium || Bangkok, Thailand || ||  ||
|-  style="background:#fbb;"
| 1990-02-06 || Loss ||align=left| Superlek Sorn E-Sarn || Lumpinee Stadium || Bangkok, Thailand || Decision  || 5 || 3:00
|-  style="background:#cfc;"
| 1989-12-18 || Win ||align=left| Panomrunglek Chor.Sawat || Lumpinee Stadium || Bangkok, Thailand || Decision|| 5 || 3:00
|-  style="background:#fbb;"
| 1989-09-08 || Loss ||align=left| Namphon Nongkee Pahuyuth|| Lumpinee Stadium || Bangkok, Thailand || Decision|| 5 || 3:00
|-  style="background:#cfc;"
| 1989-08-15 || Win ||align=left| Sanphet Lukrangsee || Lumpinee Stadium || Bangkok, Thailand || Decision || 5 || 3:00
|-  style="background:#cfc;"
| 1989-06-26 || Win ||align=left| Sanphet Lukrangsee || Rajadamnern Stadium || Bangkok, Thailand || Decision || 5 || 3:00
|-  style="background:#fbb;"
| 1989-05-30 || Loss ||align=left| Cherry Sor Wanich || Lumpinee Stadium  || Bangkok, Thailand || Decision  || 5 || 3:00
|-  bgcolor="#cfc"
| 1989-04-21 || Win ||align=left| Gilbert Ballantine || Championnat du Monde Boxe Thai || Paris, France || Decision ||  5|| 3:00
|-
! style=background:white colspan=9 |
|-  style="background:#fbb;"
| 1989-04-01 || Loss||align=left| Sanphet Lukrangsee || || Pattaya, Thailand || Decision || 5 || 3:00
|-  style="background:#fbb;"
| 1989-03-06|| Loss  ||align=left| Manasak Sor Ploenchit || Lumpinee Stadium || Bangkok, Thailand || Decision || 5 || 3:00
|-  style="background:#cfc;"
| 1989-01-31 || Win ||align=left| Petchdam Lukborai || Lumpinee Stadium  || Bangkok, Thailand || Decision  || 5 || 3:00
|-  style="background:#fbb;"
| 1988-11-30 || Loss ||align=left| Tuanthong Lukdeja || Rajadamnern Stadium || Bangkok, Thailand || Decision || 5 || 3:00
 
|-  style="background:#fbb;"
| 1988-07-26 || Loss ||align=left| Prasert Kittikasem || Lumpinee Stadium || Bangkok, Thailand || Decision || 5 || 3:00  
|-
! style=background:white colspan=9 |

|-  style="background:#fbb;"
| 1988-06-24|| Loss ||align=left| Prasert Kittikasem || Lumpinee Stadium|| Bangkok, Thailand || Decision || 5 || 3:00 

|-  style="background:#fbb;"
| 1988-04-29 || Loss ||align=left| Samransak Muangsurin || Lumpinee Stadium || Bangkok, Thailand || Decision || 5 || 3:00  
|-
! style=background:white colspan=9 |
|-  style="background:#cfc;"
| 1988-03-04|| Win ||align=left| Manasak Sor Ploenchit || Lumpinee Stadium || Bangkok, Thailand || Decision || 5 || 3:00
|-  style="background:#cfc;"
| 1988-01-26|| Win ||align=left| Saencherng Pinsinchai || Lumpinee Stadium || Bangkok, Thailand || Decision || 5 || 3:00
|-
! style=background:white colspan=9 |
|-  style="background:#cfc;"
| 1987-12-29 || Win||align=left| Jomwo Chernyim || Lumpinee Stadium ||  Bangkok, Thailand  || Decision || 5 || 3:00
|-
! style=background:white colspan=9 |
|-  style="background:#c5d2ea;"
| 1987-11-27||Draw ||align=left| Saencherng Pinsinchai || Lumpinee Stadium || Bangkok, Thailand || Decision || 5 || 3:00
|-  style="background:#fbb;"
| 1987-10-29|| Loss||align=left| Sangtiennoi Sor.Rungroj || Rajadamnern Stadium || Bangkok, Thailand || Decision || 5 || 3:00
|-  style="background:#c5d2ea;"
| 1987-09-22||Draw ||align=left| Manasak Sor Ploenchit || Lumpinee Stadium || Bangkok, Thailand || Decision || 5 || 3:00
|-  style="background:#cfc;"
| 1987-07-31 || Win||align=left| Yoknoi Fairtex || Lumpinee Stadium ||  Bangkok, Thailand  || Decision || 5 || 3:00
|-
! style=background:white colspan=9 |

|-  style="background:#fbb;"
| 1987-05-19|| Loss||align=left| Chamuekpet Hapalang || Lumpinee Stadium || Bangkok, Thailand || Decision || 5 || 3:00

|-  style="background:#cfc;"
| 1987-03-06 || Win||align=left| Jomwo Chernyim || Lumpinee Stadium ||  Bangkok, Thailand  || Decision || 5 || 3:00

|-  style="background:#cfc;"
| 1987-02-06 || Win||align=left| Bandon Sitbangprachan || Lumpinee Stadium ||  Bangkok, Thailand  || Decision || 5 || 3:00
|-
|-  style="background:#cfc;"
| 1986-12-19 || Win|| align=left| Wanlop Sitnoknit || Huamark Stadium ||  Bangkok, Thailand  || Decision || 5 || 3:00
|-
! style=background:white colspan=9 |
|-  style="background:#fbb;"
| 1986-10-14 || Loss ||align=left| Palannoi Kiatanan || Lumpinee Stadium || Bangkok, Thailand || Decision || 5 || 3:00
|-  style="background:#fbb;"
| 1986-09-09 || Loss ||align=left| Saencherng Naruepai || Lumpinee Stadium || Bangkok, Thailand || Decision || 5 || 3:00
|-  style="background:#cfc;"
| 1986-07-18 || Win||align=left| Panrit Luksiracha || Lumpinee Stadium ||  Bangkok, Thailand  || Decision || 5 || 3:00
|-
! style=background:white colspan=9 |

|-  style="background:#cfc;"
| 1986-06-21 || Win ||align=left| Sriracha Sakphannee ||  || Pak Chong District, Thailand || Decision || 5 || 3:00

|-  style="background:#fbb;"
| 1986-05-29 || Loss ||align=left| Yoknoi Fairtex || Lumpinee Stadium || Bangkok, Thailand || KO (Punches)|| 4||
|-  style="background:#fbb;"
| 1986-03-27 || Loss ||align=left| Samransak Muangsurin || Lumpinee Stadium || Bangkok, Thailand || Decision || 5 || 3:00
|-  style="background:#cfc;"
| 1986-03-04|| Win||align=left| Sanit Wichitkriangkrai || Huamark Stadium ||  Bangkok, Thailand  || Decision || 5 || 3:00

|-  style="background:#fbb;"
| 1986-01-18 || Loss||align=left| Sanit Wichitkriangkrai || Lumpinee Stadium ||  Bangkok, Thailand  || Decision || 5 || 3:00
|-
! style=background:white colspan=9 |
|-  style="background:#cfc;"
| 1985-12-06 || Win||align=left| Jongrak Lukprabat || Lumpinee Stadium ||  Bangkok, Thailand  || Decision || 5 || 3:00
|-  style="background:#cfc;"
| 1985-11-05 || Win||align=left| Wisanupon Saksamut || Lumpinee Stadium ||  Bangkok, Thailand  || Decision || 5 || 3:00
|-  style="background:#cfc;"
| 1985-10-11 || Win||align=left| Sanit Wichitkriangkrai || Lumpinee Stadium ||  Bangkok, Thailand  || Decision || 5 || 3:00
|-
! style=background:white colspan=9 |
|-  style="background:#cfc;"
| 1985-09-03 || Win||align=left| Petchdam Lukborai || Lumpinee Stadium ||  Bangkok, Thailand  || Decision || 5 || 3:00
|-
! style=background:white colspan=9 |
|-  style="background:#fbb;"
| 1985-07-26 || Loss ||align=left| Samransak Muangsurin || Lumpinee Stadium || Bangkok, Thailand || KO || 1 ||
|-  style="background:#cfc;"
| 1985-06-04 || Win||align=left| Maewnoi Sitchang || Lumpinee Stadium ||  Bangkok, Thailand  || Decision || 5 || 3:00
|-
! style=background:white colspan=9 |
|-  style="background:#cfc;"
| 1985- || Win||align=left| Maewnoi Sitchang || Lumpinee Stadium ||  Bangkok, Thailand  || Decision || 5 || 3:00
|-  style="background:#cfc;"
| 1985-03-29 || Win||align=left| Payanoi Sor.Tassanee ||Lumpinee Stadium || Bangkok, Thailand || Decision || 5 || 3:00
|-  style="background:#cfc;"
| 1985-02-|| Win||align=left| Bangkhlanoi Sor.Thanikul ||Lumpinee Stadium || Bangkok, Thailand || Referee stoppage|| 5 || 
|-  style="background:#cfc;"
| 1985-02-08 || Win||align=left| Tuanthong Lukdeja || Lumpinee Stadium || Bangkok, Thailand || Decision || 5 || 3:00
|-  style="background:#cfc;"
| 1984-12-18 || Win||align=left| Kanongsuk Sitomnoi ||Lumpinee Stadium || Bangkok, Thailand || Decision || 5 || 3:00
|-  style="background:#fbb;"
| 1984-11-20|| Loss||align=left| Chamuekpet Hapalang || Lumpinee Stadium || Bangkok, Thailand || Decision || 5 || 3:00
|-  style="background:#c5d2ea;"
| 1984-10-30 || Draw||align=left| Wisanupon Saksamut||Lumpinee Stadium || Bangkok, Thailand || Decision || 5 || 3:00
|-  style="background:#fbb;"
| 1984-09-14|| Loss ||align=left| Chamuekpet Hapalang || Lumpinee Stadium || Bangkok, Thailand || Decision || 5 || 3:00
|-  style="background:#cfc;"
| 1984-07-31 || Win||align=left| Rungsaknoi Por.Ped Sitsaphan||Lumpinee Stadium || Bangkok, Thailand || Decision || 5 || 3:00
|-  style="background:#cfc;"
| 1984-06-29 || Win||align=left| Sangwannoi Sitsaphan||Lumpinee Stadium || Bangkok, Thailand || Decision || 5 || 3:00
|-  style="background:#cfc;"
| 1984-06-12 || Win||align=left| Sakkasemnoi Fairtex ||Lumpinee Stadium || Bangkok, Thailand || Decision || 5 || 3:00
|-  style="background:#cfc;"
| 1984-05-25 || Win||align=left| Wanlopnoi Nauamthong ||Lumpinee Stadium || Bangkok, Thailand || Decision || 5 || 3:00
|-  style="background:#fbb;"
| 1984-04-24 || Loss||align=left| Paruhatlek Sitchunthong ||Lumpinee Stadium || Bangkok, Thailand || Decision || 5 || 3:00
|-  style="background:#c5d2ea;"
| 1984-03-30 || Draw||align=left| Paruhatlek Sitchunthong ||Lumpinee Stadium || Bangkok, Thailand || Decision || 5 || 3:00 
|-
! style=background:white colspan=9 |
|-  style="background:#cfc;"
| 1984-02-28 || Win||align=left| Baeber Lookchaomaechamadewi ||Lumpinee Stadium || Bangkok, Thailand || Decision || 5 || 3:00 
|-  style="background:#cfc;"
| 1984-01- || Win||align=left| Daengnoi Lukprabat || ||  Saraburi, Thailand  || Decision || 5 || 3:00

|-  style="background:#c5d2ea;"
| 1983- || Draw||align=left| Phongdet Chomphuthong ||Lumpinee Stadium || Bangkok, Thailand || Decision || 5 || 3:00 

|-  style="background:#cfc;"
| 1983- || Win||align=left| Supernoi Sitchokchai || || Thailand || TKO  || 5 || 

|-  style="background:#cfc;"
| 1983- || Win||align=left| Fahlan Lukprabat ||Lumpinee Stadium || Bangkok, Thailand || Decision || 5 || 3:00 

|-  style="background:#cfc;"
| 1983- || Win||align=left| Fahlan Lukprabat ||Lumpinee Stadium || Bangkok, Thailand || Decision || 5 || 3:00 

|-  style="background:#cfc;"
| 1983- || Win||align=left| Lukkrok Kiaturai ||Lumpinee Stadium || Bangkok, Thailand || Decision || 5 || 3:00 

|-  style="background:#fbb;"
| 1983- || Loss ||align=left| Bachchanoi WichannoiStore || || Thailand || Decision || 5 || 3:00 

|-  style="background:#cfc;"
| 1983- || Win||align=left| Pungwang Sit Sor.Wor.Por || || Thailand || Decision || 5 || 3:00 

|-  style="background:#fbb;"
| 1983- || Loss ||align=left| Thuanthong Lukdeja || || Thailand || Decision || 5 || 3:00 

|-  style="background:#cfc;"
| 1983- || Win||align=left| Samray Lukrangsee || || Thailand || Decision || 5 || 3:00 

|-  style="background:#fbb;"
| 1982- || Loss||align=left| Phothong Sripornsawan || || Thailand || Decision || 5 || 3:00 

|-  style="background:#fbb;"
| 1982- || Loss||align=left| Panomtuanlek Hapalang || || Thailand || Decision || 5 || 3:00 

|-  style="background:#cfc;"
| 1982- || Win||align=left| Phothong Sripornsawan || || Thailand || Decision || 5 || 3:00 

|-  style="background:#fbb;"
| 1982-04-11 || Loss||align=left| Komet Sakniran || || Thailand || Decision || 5 || 3:00 
|-
| colspan=9 | Legend:

References

1967 births
Living people
Chanchai Sor Tamarangsri
Chanchai Sor Tamarangsri